United Nations Security Council resolution 622, adopted unanimously on 20 September 1988, after noting the Geneva Accords agreement signed on 14 April 1988, the Council confirmed the agreement to the measures in the letters of the Secretary-General concerning the settlement of the situation in Afghanistan.

The Council therefore confirmed the establishment of the United Nations Good Offices Mission in Afghanistan and Pakistan in May 1988 and made provisions for a temporary dispatch of 50 military officers to assist in the mission as requested by the Secretary-General. It also required the Secretary-General to keep the Council updated on progress in the region.

See also
 List of United Nations Security Council Resolutions 601 to 700 (1987–1991)
 Soviet–Afghan War

References

External links
 
Text of the Resolution at undocs.org

 0622
Cold War military history of the Soviet Union
Afghanistan–Soviet Union relations
Political history of Afghanistan
1988 in the Soviet Union
Pakistan–Soviet Union relations
Afghanistan–Pakistan relations
 0622
 0622
 0622
Soviet–Afghan War
October 1988 events